Janavičy ( Janavičy,  Yanovichi) is a town in the Vitebsk District in Belarus. It is located about 36 kilometers east of Vitebsk. The population is 929 inhabitants (2009).

History
In 1939, Janavičy had 709 Jewish residents (34.8% of the total population). On August 15, 1941, 149 Jews from the village were shot in the nearby village of Valki. On September 10, 1941 a ghetto of Jews in the village was liquidated and the inhabitants shot in the nearby village of Zaitsevo.

References

External links 
 

Urban-type settlements in Belarus
Populated places in Vitebsk Region
Vitebsk Voivodeship
Vitebsky Uyezd
Jewish Belarusian history
Holocaust locations in Belarus